Rachal is an unincorporated community in south-central Brooks County, Texas, United States. According to the Handbook of Texas, the community had a population of 36 in 2000.

History
The community, established in 1913, is named for E.R. Rachal, the first Brooks County tax assessor. Rachal had 10 residents and only one business in 1936. The population grew to 40 by 1945, with a second business added. Since 1964, the population has varied 30 and 40. It had 36 residents and a few businesses in the 2000.

Geography

Education
Rachal is served by the Brooks County Independent School District.

References

Unincorporated communities in Brooks County, Texas
Unincorporated communities in Texas